Vincent Vallières (born August 8, 1978) is a Canadian singer from Sherbrooke.

Career
Vallières debut album, Trente Arpents, was released in 1999, followed by Bordel Ambiant in 2001 . He became popular in Quebec in 2003 with the release of his third album, Chacun Dans Son Espace. On August 29, 2006, his fourth album, Le Repère Tranquille, was released, with the first single "Je pars à pied" immediately put into the regular rotations of many Québec radio stations. The second single from the latest album, "Un quart de piasse", is currently receiving airplay.

His 2021 album Toute beauté n'est pas perdue was a Juno Award nominee for Francophone Album of the Year at the Juno Awards of 2022.

Discography

Albums
Trente arpents, 1999
Bordel ambiant, 2001
Chacun dans son espace, 2003
Le Repère tranquille, 2006
Le Monde tourne fort, 2009, Gold (Music Canada)
Fabriquer l'aube, 2013, Gold (Music Canada)
Le temps des vivants, 2017
Toute beauté n'est pas perdue, 2021

Singles

Prizes and honors
 2005: Prix Félix-Leclerc de la chanson (Québec)
 2007: Prix Gilles-Vigneault

References

External links 
 Vincent Vallières Biography at answers.com
 CBC Radio
 DND news article
 Vincent Vallières Official site

1978 births
Living people
French-language singers of Canada
French Quebecers
Musicians from Sherbrooke
Canadian male guitarists
21st-century Canadian guitarists
21st-century Canadian male singers
Félix Award winners